Mark Alan Williams-Thomas (born 9 January 1970) is an English investigative journalist, sexual abuse victim advocate, and former police officer. He is a regular reporter on This Morning and Channel 4 News, as well as the ITV series Exposure and the ITV and Netflix crime series The Investigator: A British Crime Story.

As a child-protection specialist, Williams-Thomas is best known for exposing Jimmy Savile as a paedophile in The Other Side of Jimmy Savile, a television documentary he presented in 2012 as part of the Exposure series, which received numerous awards and led to the Operation Yewtree police investigation. He has also investigated several other high-profile cases, including the disappearance of Madeleine McCann.

Background 

Williams-Thomas was born in Billericay, Essex. He was educated at Amesbury School and Pierrepoint, and later attended Birmingham City University. In 1989, he joined Surrey Police. During his time with Surrey Police, he was a specialist in major crime and child abuse. He left the force in 2000.

Williams-Thomas completed his MA in criminology from Birmingham City University in 2007.

In 2013 Williams-Thomas was awarded a Post Graduate Diploma (Honours) and master's degree (MA) in Criminology at Birmingham City University.

Police career 

Williams-Thomas was a detective and family liaison officer with Surrey Police from 1989 to 2000. 

On 27 November 1995, schoolgirl Ruth Wilson aged 16 years went missing from her home in from Betchworth, near Dorking Surrey, England. Williams-Thomas was the family liaison officer for Wilson's case, stated that extensive searches across Box Hill had yielded no evidence to suggest she was killed or committed suicide. He also stated that he was sure Wilson was not abducted by a stranger. Williams-Thomas also stated; "From the experience I have had, I would suggest one of two things occurred. She either went up there to meet someone and has subsequently gone away, or she went there and died in some way."

In August 1997 Williams-Thomas was part of the investigation into child pornography found in the possession of school teacher Adrian Stark, the director of music at St John's School, Leatherhead, Surrey, who committed suicide shortly after his arrest.

In 2001, Williams-Thomas launched the investigation into the child abuse of Jonathan King, leading to his successful conviction and imprisonment.

Between 2001 and 2002, Williams-Thomas was the marketing manager and a director of GumFighters, a "national chewing gum removal specialist". The company were hired by various councils to clean their streets.

In 2003, Williams-Thomas was charged with blackmailing a funeral home director, after alleging that there were multiple bodies buried in unmarked graves. An article ran in a national Sunday paper describing the mass burials. He was subsequently acquitted.

In 2005, Williams-Thomas set up WT Associates, an independent child protection consultancy firm.

Television career

Early television career 
From 2003, due to his past in the police force, Williams-Thomas began script advising for various television crime dramas which included BBC series Waking The Dead (2007-2011), BBC series Inspector Lynley Mysteries (2007), Channel 5 series Murder Prevention (2004), ITV series Identity and BBC series The Silence.

In 2011 Williams-Thomas created and presented a new series on ITV called On the Run. The premise of the series was to track down and confront offenders on the run from the police. The series ran over three seasons. Series 1 was broadcast on 24 October 2011. Series 2 was broadcast on 11 December 2012 and Williams-Thomas was joined by co-presenter Nicky Campbell. Series 3 was broadcast on 29 October 2013 and Williams-Thomas was joined by co-presenter Natasha Kaplinsky. In series three Williams-Thomas and his team pursued a convicted child sex offender on the run in Spain.

On 9 August 2012, ITV News broadcast an exclusive interview Williams-Thomas undertook with Stuart Hazell, who was the last person to see missing 12-year-old schoolgirl Tia Sharp. Hazell went missing the day after this interview and was arrested later the same day on suspicion of Sharp's murder. He was later charged and on 14 May 2013 was jailed after changing his plea. The judge ordered that he serve a minimum of 38 years.

The Other Side of Jimmy Savile 

Willliams-Thomas began investigating the Jimmy Savile case in late 2011, after being informed that Savile was investigated by Surrey police in the late 2000s. On 3 October 2012, Williams-Thomas presented the Exposure documentary The Other Side of Jimmy Savile on ITV, in which five women stated that they had been sexually abused by Savile as teenagers. By late October 2012, the scandal had resulted in inquiries or reviews at the BBC, within the National Health Service, the Crown Prosecution Service, and the Department of Health. The exposure of Savile as a paedophile led to extensive media coverage, including 41 days on the front pages. In June 2014, investigations into Savile's activities at 28 NHS hospitals, including Leeds General Infirmary and Broadmoor psychiatric hospital, concluded that he had sexually assaulted staff and patients aged between 5 and 75 over several decades. In response to the documentary, the Metropolitan police launched the Operation Yewtree police investigation, which led to the arrest of high-profile celebrities (including Rolf Harris, Max Clifford, and Gary Glitter).

Williams-Thomas presented the follow-up documentary The Jimmy Savile Investigation later that year. The Other Side of Jimmy Savile and Exposure: Banaz: An Honour Killing won the 2012 Peabody Award which was broadcast on 3 October 2012. In 2013, Williams-Thomas won two Royal Television Society awards and the London Press Awards Scoop of the Year for the film. The episode and Exposure: Banaz: An Honour Killing won a 2012 George Foster Peabody Award. In September 2013, MP Tim Loughton made a statement to Parliament in which he praised Williams-Thomas for his "modest but game-changing ITV documentary that exposed Jimmy Savile".

Later television work 
After the success of the Jimmy Savile documentary, Williams-Thomas presented two further Exposure documentaries; Exposure: Predators Abroad and Exposure: Inside the Diplomatic Bag. His undercover work in Cambodia led to the arrest in 2013 of a person suspected of offering underage girls for sex and the rescue of two girls, aged 13 and 14.

In 2014, Williams-Thomas covered the verdict of Oscar Pistorius and was the only British journalist to meet with Pistorius during his trial, writing an exclusive report for UK national newspaper Daily Mirror. On 24 June 2016, ITV broadcast Oscar Pistorius: The Interview in which the former Paralympian spoke in a world exclusive to Williams-Thomas, in his first television interview about the night he shot and killed his girlfriend, Reeva Steenkamp in 2013. It was broadcast in Pistorius's home country of South Africa immediately after the ITV programme finished. On 11 November 2014, This Morning broadcast an exclusive interview with Jo Westwood, the ex-wife of sex offender Max Clifford.

In 2015, Williams-Thomas investigated the unsolved murder of BBC presenter Jill Dando. Writing in the Daily Mirror he theorized that she was murdered by the London underworld for her work on Crimewatch.

Williams-Thomas was the reporter for ITV's crime series The Investigator: A British Crime Story, produced by Simon Cowell's Syco. The series re-examined a 30 year old previously 'closed' murder case, the murder of Carole Packman, whose body has never been found. The series was broadcast over four consecutive weeks on ITV, from 14 July 2016. Dorset Police subsequently confirmed that the case remained open and that they would be examining new evidence presented by Williams-Thomas. Series 2 of Williams-Thomas's crime series The Investigator returned to ITV in April 2018 in a three-part series. Series 2 of The Investigator featured the case of murdered student Jessie Earl, who disappeared from Eastbourne in 1980, her remains being found in 1989. In November 2020, in response to a campaign led by Williams-Thomas into Earl's murder, the Solicitor-General, in a highly unusual move, gave permission to appeal the verdict for a fresh inquest. The Rt. Hon. Michael Ellis QC MP said: "I have concluded the initial investigation was insufficient and further lines of inquiry should have been pursued. It is in the interest of justice the application for a new inquest be heard by the High Court."

In 2019 Williams-Thomas started investigating for a new crime series the unsolved murder of teenage mum Nicola Payne. Nicola Payne, aged 18, who was from Coventry and had a 6 month old son at the time, went missing on 14 December 1991. She was on her way to her parents' home. Her body has never been found and remains one of the country's biggest unsolved murder investigations.

In September 2020 following the arrest of Charles and Doris Clark on suspicion of the murder of their 23 years old son Steven, who disappeared in December 1992, Williams-Thomas was given exclusive access to follow the family for a TV documentary while they were under police investigation. In April 2022, in an interview discussing the Netflix documentary Jimmy Savile: A British Horror Story, Willliams-Thomas said the series might be harmful to Savile's victims due to his face being featured throughout: "I do worry as far as victims go, it's one of the things that strongly gets criticised now when the story's talked about, seeing his face - his picture on the front page. For those victims to see his face consistently over and over again, that is very traumatic for them."

Filmography 
 To Catch a Paedophile (series) (2009; ITV)
 Tonight: Bullies online (2010; ITV)
 On The Run (series) (2011–13; ITV)
 Exposure: The Other Side of Jimmy Savile (2012; ITV)
 Exposure: The Jimmy Savile Investigation (2012; ITV)
 Missing Without Trace (2012; ITV)
 Bamber: The New Evidence (2012; ITV)
 Living With a Killer (2013; ITV)
 Exposure: Predators Abroad (2013; ITV)
 Exposure: Inside the Diplomatic Bag (2014; ITV)
 Oscar Pistorius: The Interview (2016; ITV)
 The Investigator: A British Crime Story (Series 1 2016; ITV)
The Investigator: A British Crime Story (Series 2 2018; ITV)

Publications 
 Hunting Killers: Britain's top crime investigator reveals how he solves the unsolvable. Bantam Press, 2019,

See also
Chris Clark – fellow British author who has also produced documentaries and written on unsolved crimes
Jimmy Savile sexual abuse scandal - the main case Williams-Thomas investigated which led to the Operation Yewtree investigation
Disappearance of Madeleine McCann - another case Williams-Thomas has investigated
Murder of Helen Gorrie - another case Williams-Thomas has investigated

References

External links
 Official website
 WT Associates
 

1970 births
Living people
Alumni of Birmingham City University
British investigative journalists
British police officers
English television journalists
People acquitted of crimes
People from Billericay
People from Surrey
Sexual abuse victim advocates